Wafi Salih (born 5 June 5 1965 in Trujillo) is a Venezuelan-born writer of Lebanese descent. Writer of: poetry, short stories, essays, dramaturgy and film scripts. She is recognized as “the master of short poetry in Venezuela” for her extensive exploration of  haiku poetry, a literary genre of Japanese origin. Her books has been translated into English, Arabic, French, Italian, Portuguese and Polish.

Biography 
Magister in Latin American Literature, graduated from the “Universidad de los Andes”. She has a doctoral project in History and twenty books published in several genres. She was founder of “José Antonio Ramos Sucre” a literary workshop for seven consecutive years, which contributed to the training of Venezuelan artists and researchers.

Her thesis about female gender, is an innovative proposal about feminism. A profuse reflection that opens a question about the modes of cultural production and its effects on the social being. This research was published in Monte Ávila Editores in 2007 under the name: “The images of the absent”.

Bibliography

Poetry  
 Adagio (Adage) (1987) 
 Los cantos de la noche. (Songs of the night) (1990):
 Las horas del aire (The hours of the air) (1991)
 Pájaro de raíces (Bird of roots) (2002) Winner of the poetry contest “Every day a book”, 2004
 El Dios de las dunas (The God of the Dunes) (2005) 
 Huésped del alba (Guest of dawn) (2006) 
 Jugando con la poesía (Playing with poetry) (2006) 
 Caligrafía del aire (Air Calligraphy) (2007) 
 Cielos descalzos (Barefoot Skies) (2009) 
 Vigilia de huesos (Vigil of bones) (2010) 
 Con el índice de una lágrima (the index finger of a tear )
 Honor al fuego (Honor to the fire) (2018) 
 Consonantes de agua (Water Consonants) (2018) 
 Sojam (Sojam) (2018) 
 Cielo avaro (Greedy heaven) (2018) 
 Serena en la plenitud (Serene in the fullness) (2020) Anthology.

Essays and Narrative  

Las imágenes de la ausente. (The images of the absent) (2012) Essay. 
Más allá de lo que somos. (Beyond who we are) (2018) Essay. 
Hombre moreno viene en camino. (Black man is on his way): Theatrical monologues. 
Discípula de Jung. (Disciple of Jung) (2016): Story.

References

1965 births
Living people
Venezuelan writers
20th-century women writers